Harrigan's Kid is a 1943 American drama film directed by Charles Reisner and written by Martin Berkeley, Henry Blankfort and Alan Friedman. The film stars Bobby Readick, Frank Craven, William Gargan, J. Carrol Naish and Jay Ward. The film was released on March 17, 1943, by Metro-Goldwyn-Mayer.

Plot

Tom Harrigan raises orphaned Benny McNeil to be a first-rate jockey, but fails to bridle the lad's healthy ego. When Benny receives too many rebukes for unsportsmanlike conduct from the racing commission, Tom decides to sell his contract to Garnet before he, too, is censured. Tom also reasons that, by having Benny with a top outfit, he can manipulate his races and make a fortune on the betting. But Benny, thanks to the humanizing influence of Mr. Garnet, has a different idea....

Cast 
Bobby Readick as Benny McNeil
Frank Craven as Walter Garnet
William Gargan as Tom Harrigan
J. Carrol Naish as Jed Jerrett
Jay Ward as McNamara
Douglas Croft as Skip
Bill Cartledge as Joe
Irving Lee as Dink
Selmer Jackson as Mr. Ranley
Allen Wood as Etley
Jim Toney as Sam
Mickey Martin as Jockey
Russell Hicks as Col. Lowry

References

External links 
 

1943 films
American drama films
Metro-Goldwyn-Mayer films
Films directed by Charles Reisner
Films scored by Daniele Amfitheatrof
American black-and-white films
1943 drama films
1940s English-language films
1940s American films